Martinez Hacienda, also known as Hacienda de los Martinez, is a Taos County, New Mexico hacienda built during the Spanish colonial era. It is now a living museum listed on the National Register of Historic Places. It is located on the bank of the Rio Pueblo de Taos.

Name
According to Miriam Webster, Hacienda meant a "large landed estate" in Spanish during the Spanish colonization of the Americas. Its origin is the Old Spanish word facienda, which came from a Latin word that meant to do or things to be done. Often, Native Americans were brought on as "free wage" laborers.

History
Don Antonio Severino Martinez, also known as Severino Martinez, bought the property about 2 miles southwest of the Taos Plaza in 1804, after relocating his family from Abiquiu to Taos that year. At first the building was a four-room dwelling and then it grew as Martinez became more successful. It was made of thick adobe walls, without exterior windows. The hacienda had 2 inner courtyards, or placitas, around which a total of 21 rooms were built. It was constructed as a fortress for protection against attacks by Plains tribes, such as Comanche and Apache raiders. When there was a threat of violence, the livestock were brought into the courtyards of the hacienda for safety.

Martinez married Maria del Carmel Santistevan or Maria del Carmen Santisteban in Abiquiu in 1787. They had six children together, all of whom lived after the death of their parents. He was alcalde (mayor) of Taos, a trader and merchant.

Owning five square miles of land, it was the largest Taos Valley hacienda and was a working ranch and farm. Severino raised pigs, goats, oxen, mules, burros, horses and sheep. Crops included corn, squash, wheat, peas and chilis. Severino had acquired Navajo and Ute workers for ranch and agricultural work. Maria managed 30 Native American servants on the hacienda, including women who made finished woven or knitted goods from raw wool and tanned leather. The men, women and children who served on the farm were acquired from Native American or Mexican traders.

During the Spanish colonial period, goods were either made locally or transported from Mexico City to Taos along the Spanish El Camino Real de Tierra Adentro trade route, of which the hacienda was the final northerly stop. El Camino Real trade is depicted in the hacienda museum's exhibits. He also traded goods along the Santa Fe Trail after it opened up in 1821.

Severino Martinez built a flourishing mercantile business trading goods from Northern New Mexico, allowing him to send his son Antonio José Martínez to study for the priesthood in Durango, Mexico. Antonio José was a spiritual leader in Taos from 1826 to 1867.

Severino lived at the hacienda until his death in 1827. In his will, Severino left his "vast" fortune, most of which was made through trade through Chihuahua, Mexico, to his six children, a nephew and 2 emancipated female servants. One of the emancipated women was his half-sister by his father. The Martinez family held on to the property when Mexico took control of New Mexico from Spain, and again when it became a United States territory and state. It was sold in 1931 outside of the family and over the years fell into disrepair. It was purchased and reconstruction began in 1961 by Jerome Milord and his family. In 1969 or 1972 it was sold to the Kit Carson Memorial Foundation who restored the property. The hacienda was fully restored by 1982 to its state in 1820.

Museum 
Now owned by the Taos Historic Museums,<ref>"Taos Historic Museums to honor four with awards". The Taos News". June 9, 2013. Retrieved July 27, 2014.</ref> it is a living museum honoring the contributions of the early Hispanic settlers in the Taos Valley. It is particularly focused on life during the 1820s under Spanish colonial rule. For instance, the weaving exhibits display wool died with vegetable based tints. And the hacienda's interior walls are white washed with tierra blanca'', which is a mixture of micaceous clay and wheat paste.

It is one of the few remaining Spanish colonial haciendas that is open to the public throughout the year in the United States.

It hosts the annual Taos Trade Fair in late September to reenact Spanish colonial life and celebrate the trade among mountain men, Native Americans and Spanish settlers. Demonstrations are performed of blacksmiths, wood carvers and weavers. In addition to a working weaving room, there is also a blacksmith shop within the museum.

See also

National Register of Historic Places listings in Taos County, New Mexico

Notes

References

Further reading

External links

 Taos Historic Museums - official site

Buildings and structures in Taos, New Mexico
Colonial Mexico
Forts in New Mexico
Historic house museums in New Mexico
History of Taos, New Mexico
Houses on the National Register of Historic Places in New Mexico
Museums in Taos, New Mexico
Houses in Taos County, New Mexico
National Register of Historic Places in Taos County, New Mexico
Haciendas